Enrique Agudo Camacho (born 1 January 1967 in Tarragona) is a class 10 table tennis player from Spain.  He played table tennis at the 1996, 2000 and 2004 Summer Paralympics. In 1996, he finished third in the men's class 10 singles event. In 2000, he finished third in the class 10 doubles event.

References

External links 
 
 

1967 births
Spanish male table tennis players
Table tennis players at the 1996 Summer Paralympics
Table tennis players at the 2000 Summer Paralympics
Table tennis players at the 2004 Summer Paralympics
Paralympic table tennis players of Spain
Medalists at the 1996 Summer Paralympics
Medalists at the 2000 Summer Paralympics
Paralympic medalists in table tennis
Paralympic bronze medalists for Spain
Spanish disabled table tennis players
Sportspeople from Tarragona
Living people